Kvesarum Castle or Qvesarum Castle ( or Qvesarums slott) is a castle and an estate in Södra Rörum in Hörby Municipality, Scania, Sweden.

It is first mentioned in 1388, then spelled Quixarum. The current building was completed in 1865.

The current owner is Christina Feith-Wachtmeister (née Wachtmeister), who is married to the Dutch diplomat Pieter Feith.

Owners
1388-1536  Lund Cathedral Chapter
1536-1607  The Danish Crown
1607-1637  Sigvardt Grubbe
1637-   von Böhmen
Anders Daniel Stierneloo-Lillienberg
Johan Christoffer von Rohr
Christoffer Bogislaus Zibèt
Ebbe Ludvig Ziebeth
Erik Gustaf Ruuth
Melker Falkenberg
Peter Axel Dahl
Vivika Charlotta Kristina Trolle married Dahl
1865–1894  Wladimir Moltke-Huitfeldt
1894–1917  Adam Wladimir Moltke-Huitfeldt
1936-1976  Thorleif Paus
Christina Feith-Wachtmeister

References

Castles in Skåne County
Hörby Municipality
Houses completed in 1865
Paus family